Ulric Gaster Williams (22 May 1890 – 21 December 1971) was a New Zealand doctor and naturopath. He was born in Putiki, Wanganui, New Zealand in 1890. He received his education at Wanganui Collegiate School. While "regarded by many as a crank and a fanatic", his advocates describe him as "an original thinker" whose ideas on natural living were "perhaps ahead of his time".

References

1890 births
1971 deaths
New Zealand general practitioners
People from Whanganui
Naturopaths
People educated at Whanganui Collegiate School